Antonio Delgado (born 1977) is the lieutenant governor of New York since 2022.

Antonio Delgado may also refer to:

 Antonio Delgado Palomo (1957–2021), Paralympic track and field athlete from Spain, competed at the 1976 Summer Paralympics
 Antonio C. Delgado (1917–1992), industrialist and civic leader, Philippine Ambassador to the Vatican
 Antonio M. Delgado (died c. 1937), Puerto Rican politician
 Antonio Delgado (footballer) (born 1939), Cape Verdean football player